Sujapur is a populated place not identified in 2011 census as a separate place, in the Indian state of West Bengal. It is the most muslims populous majority area in Malda district. It is under jurisdiction of Kaliachak I block. It's popularly known for Nai Mouza that consists of 9 villages, namely, Boro Sujapur CT, Gayeshbari CT, Mosimpur CT, Bamangram CT, Bhakharpur CT, Chama gram/Nazirpur CT, Chhoto Sujapur CT, Chaspara CT. This is upcoming municipal area in Malda district. Govt declares establishing a police station very soon.

There is an announcement that Chanchal and Gazole would be amongst the 22 new municipalities to be formed in West Bengal. The matter has also been reported in the press, but there has been no formal announcement/ notification. There is no such report about Sujapur.

Note:For information on population growth in the area, see Kaliachak I#Population

Geography 
Sujapur is located at  Malda district, West Bengal. It has an average elevation of 17 metres (56 feet). It is on the western bank of the river river Bhagirathi (old). As in much of Bengal, the weather is usually extremely humid and tropical. Temperatures can reach as high as 46 °C during the day in May and June and fall as low as 4 °C overnight in December and January.

History 
This area was settled in the time of ShahJahan by Said Rai, a north Indian Kayastha.Sujapur is located in the boarder area of India and Bangladesh.

References 

Cities and towns in Malda district